The 1992 UEFA European Under-21 Championship, which spanned two years (1990–92), had 32 entrants.  
Malta and Israel competed for the first time. This was also the first appearance of the unified Germany team. Italy U-21s won the competition.

The competition doubled as the European qualifying round for the Olympic Football Tournament.  Hosts Spain qualify automatically and the best four eligible nations would qualify automatically. The fifth best European team would play-off against the best Oceania (OFC) team for another Olympics place.

The 32 national teams were divided into eight groups (six groups of 4 + one group of 3 + one group of 5). The group winners played off against each other on a two-legged home-and-away basis until the winner was decided.  There was no finals tournament or 3rd-place playoff.

Qualifying stage

Draw
The allocation of teams into qualifying groups was based on that of UEFA Euro 1992 qualifying tournament with several changes, reflecting the absence of some nations:
 Groups 1 and 7 featured the same nations
 Group 2 did not include San Marino (moved to Group 4)
 Group 3 did not include Cyprus (moved to Group 8)
 Group 4 did not include Northern Ireland and Faroe Islands, but included San Marino (moved from Group 1)
 Group 5 did not include Wales
 Group 6 did not include Greece (moved to Group 8)
 Group 8 composed of Cyprus (moved from Group 3), Greece (moved from Group 7), Sweden and Israel (both of whom did not participate in senior Euro qualification)

Qualified teams

1 Bold indicates champion for that year

Squads

Only players born on or after 1 January 1969 were eligible to play in the tournament.

Knockout stages

Quarter-finals

First leg

Second leg

Semi-finals

First leg

Second leg

Final

First leg

Second leg

Goalscorers

3 goals
 Renato Buso

2 goals

 Peter Møller
 Miklos Molnar
 Gerry Creaney
 Pascal Simpson

1 goal

 Radim Nečas
 Per Frandsen
 Peter Frank
 Heiko Herrlich
 Markus Kranz
 Nils Schmäler
 Mehmet Scholl
 Mauro Bertarelli
 Luca Luzardi
 Alessandro Melli
 Roberto Muzzi
 Gianluca Sordo
 Robert Roest
 Gaston Taument
 Andrzej Juskowiak
 Paul Lambert
 Ray McKinnon
 Alex Rae
 Christer Fursth
 Jonny Rödlund

Own goal
 Martin Kotůlek (playing against Italy)

Medal table and Olympic qualifiers

1992 UEFA European under-21 championship medal table

Olympic qualifiers 
 Denmark, Italy and Sweden as winners of their quarter-final rounds qualify for Olympic Games finals. Since the fourth winner Scotland do not compete in the Olympic Football Tournament (See Great Britain Olympic football team), Poland qualifies instead, being the best of the four quarter-final losers according to a special coefficient which is calculated based on the points achieved in the group stage and the quarter-finals, divided by the number of games played. Poland's coefficient is 1.625, while the Netherlands, Czechoslovakia and Germany have achieved a score of 1.5. The Netherlands having the best goal differential is the one of these three teams to face OFC champions in playoff for an additional place.

POLAND	  13 points/8 games played = 1.625
Netherlands	  12 points/8 games played = 1.5 (+ goals: 22/6 = 3.67)
Czechoslovakia  15 points/10 games played = 1.5 (+ goals: 24/8 = 3.0)
Germany	   9 points/6 games played = 1.5 (+ goals: 16/6 = 2.67)

OFC–UEFA play-off

References

External links 
 Results Archive at uefa.com
 RSSSF Results Archive ''at rsssf.com

UEFA European Under-21 Championship
Football qualification for the 1992 Summer Olympics
UEFA
UEFA
1992 in youth association football